Bisheshwar Prasad Singh (born 9 July 1942) is an Indian Judge and former Judge of Supreme Court of India.

Early life
Singh was born in 1942 in a Rajput Judge's family in Arrah. He is the grandson of Bhuvaneshwar Prasad Sinha, 6th Chief Justice of India and his father Rameshwar Prasad Singh was a judge of the Patna High Court. He studied at St. Xavier's High School, Patna and St. Columba's School, Delhi. He passed Senior Cambridge examination with first Division in 1958 and entered into Hindu College, Delhi. Singh completed his graduation from Delhi University in 1961 and became the topper of the University. In 1963 he passed Law from Delhi University.

Career
He was enrolled as an Advocate in October 1963 and started practice in the Supreme Court of India on Civil, Criminal and Constitutional matters. He became the additional Judge of Patna High Court on 9 March 1987. Singh was transferred to the Karnataka High Court in 1990. On 9 September 1991 he was re transferred to Patna High Court again. On 31 March 2000 Justice Singh was appointed the Chief Justice of Bombay High Court. He was elevated as Judge of the Supreme Court of India on 14 December 2001. On 8 July 2007 he retired from the post.

References

1942 births
Living people
Indian judges
Judges of the Patna High Court
Judges of the Karnataka High Court
Chief Justices of the Bombay High Court
Justices of the Supreme Court of India
St. Xavier's Patna alumni
St. Columba's School, Delhi alumni
20th-century Indian judges
20th-century Indian lawyers
People from Arrah